For the Throne: Music Inspired by the HBO Series Game of Thrones is a soundtrack inspired by the television series Game of Thrones, released by Columbia Records on April 26, 2019. The album features two promotional singles, "Kingdom of One" by Maren Morris and "Nightshade" by The Lumineers, which were released simultaneously on April 12, 2019, as well as the SZA, The Weeknd and Travis Scott collaborative single, "Power Is Power", which was released on April 18, 2019.

Reception

AllMusic's Stephen Thomas Erlewine rated the album 2.5 out of 5 stars.

Track listing
Credits adapted from Tidal.

Notes
  signifies a co-producer
  signifies a miscellaneous producer
 "Nightshade" features background vocals by Lauren Jacobsen
 "Turn on Me" features background vocals by Arone Dyer and Kyle Resnick

Charts

See also
 Music of Game of Thrones

References

2019 compilation albums
2019 soundtrack albums
Columbia Records compilation albums
Columbia Records soundtracks
Game of Thrones
Music of Game of Thrones